Streptacidiphilus griseoplanus is a bacterium species from the genus Streptacidiphilus which has been isolated from grassland soil in Iowa in the United States. Streptacidiphilus griseoplanus produces alazopeptin, erythromycin and anticapsin.

Further reading

References

External links
Type strain of Streptomyces griseoplanus at BacDive -  the Bacterial Diversity Metadatabase

Streptomycineae
Bacteria described in 1957